Barad may refer to:

 Barad, Syria, a historic village in Syria
 Barad (name), a surname and given name
 Barad (band), an Iranian rock band
 Barye or barad, a CGS unit of pressure
 Barad, the Hebrew name for the seventh of the ten Biblical Plagues of Egypt

See also